The 2008 Tour de l'Aude Cycliste Féminin was the 24th edition of the Tour de l'Aude Cycliste Féminin, a women's cycling stage race in France. It was rated by the UCI as a category 2.1 race and was held between 16 and 25 May 2008.

Stages

Prologue
16 May 2008 – Gruissan to Gruissan, Individual time trial

Stage 1
17 May 2008 – Rieux Minervois to Rieux Minervois,

Stage 2
18 May 2008 – Port La Nouvelle to Port La Nouvelle, Team time trial

Stage 3
19 May 2008 – Lezignan Corbières to Lezignan Corbières,

Stage 4
20 May 2008 – Osseja to Osseja,

Stage 5
21 May 2008 – Toulouges to Toulouges,

Stage 6
22 May 2008 – Rennes-les-Bains to Axat,

Stage 7
23 May 2008 – Castelnaudary to Castelnaudary,

Stage 8
24 May 2008 – Bram to Bram,

Stage 9
25 May 2008 – Limoux to Limoux,

Final classification

Source

See also
 2008 in women's road cycling

References

External links
 

Tour de l'Aude Cycliste Feminin
Tour de l'Aude Cycliste Féminin
Tour de l'Aude Cycliste Feminin
Tour de l'Aude Cycliste Feminin